Pirog is an Eastern Slavic pie consisting of dough with a sweet or savoury filling. It may also refer to:

People
 Dmitry Pirog (born 1980), Russian boxer
 Maureen Pirog, American scholar and policy analyst
 Michał Piróg (born 1979), Polish dancer and television personality

Other
Piróg, a village in Poland
Pirozhki, Eastern Slavic fried buns, a small version of pirog 
Pierogi, Polish and Ukrainian semicircular dumplings
Pirogue, a boat

See also